The 2014–15 UTEP Miners women's basketball team represents the University of Texas at El Paso during the 2014–15 NCAA Division I women's basketball season. The Miners, led by 14th year head coach Keitha Adams, play their home games at the Don Haskins Center and were members of Conference USA. They finished the season 12–16, 7–11 in C-USA play to finish in a tie for tenth place. They lost in the first round of the C-USA women's tournament to UAB.

Roster

Schedule

|-
! colspan="9" style="background:#ff7f00; color:navy;"| Exhibition

|-
! colspan="9" style="background:#ff7f00; color:navy;"| Regular Season

|-
! colspan="9" style="background:#ff7f00; color:navy;"| Conference USA Women's Tournament

See also
2014–15 UTEP Miners basketball team

References

UTEP Miners women's basketball seasons
UTEP